Albert Steinrück (20 May 1872 – 10 February 1929) was a German stage and film actor of the silent era. He appeared in more than 80 films between 1910 and 1929. He starred in the 1923 film The Treasure, which was directed by Georg Wilhelm Pabst. He was also a leading role in the German expressionist 1920 film The Golem, in which he plays a rabbi.

Selected filmography

 Japanisches Opfer (1910) - Ein Delegierter
 Der Volkstyrann (1913) - Gouverneur
 Prinz Keo. Der Raub der Mumie (1919) - Professor Scrupello
 Die sterbende Salome (1919) - Bildhauer
 Das Milliardentestament (1920)
 The Girl from Acker Street (1920-1921, part 1, 3) - Vater Schulze
 Catherine the Great (1920)
 Madame Récamier (1920)
 The Mayor of Zalamea (1920) - Pedro Crespo
 The Golem: How He Came into the World (1920) - Der Rabbi Löw / Rabbi Loew
 The Guilt of Lavinia Morland (1920) - John Morland
 Berlin W. (1920)
 Ana Bolena (1920)
 The Closed Chain (1920)
 Schieber (1921) - Max Modersohn
 Der Streik der Diebe (1921)
 Burning Country (1921)
 Exzellenz Unterrock (1921) - Neaumarchais
 Das Mädchen, das wartet (1921)
 Die Geschichte von Barak Johnson (1921)
 The Hotel of the Dead (1921, part 1) - Senator Petersen
 Night and No Morning (1921) - Zirkusdirektor Mortera
 Sappho (1921) - Andreas
 The Vulture Wally (1921) - Stromminger, der Höchstbauer
 The Convict of Cayenne (1921)
 Das Geheimnis der Santa Margherita (1921)
 The Passion of Inge Krafft (1921) - Fürst Wladimir Gagarine
 Perlen bedeuten Tränen (1921)
 Das Haus in der Weichselgasse (1921)
 Fridericus Rex (1922-1923, part 1, 2, 4) - Friedrich Wilhelm I.
 The Blood (1922)
 The Circle of Death (1922) - Lebedow, Reitknecht
 The Flight into Marriage (1922) - Onkel
 Monna Vanna (1922) - Andreas Buonacorsi
 Die Nacht der Medici (1922)
 Die Küsse der Ira Toscari (1922)
 The Treasure (1923) - Svetocar Badalic, Master Foundryman
 The Red Rider (1923)
 Scheine des Todes (1923)
 The Merchant of Venice (1923) - Tubal
 Girls You Don't Marry (1923)
 The Weather Station (1923) - Der Wetterwart
 Helena (1924) - Priamos
 The House by the Sea (1924) - Werber
 Decameron Nights (1924) - King Algarve
 Slaves of Love (1924)
 Die Tragödie der Entehrten (1924)
 Die Schuld (1924)
 The Golden Calf (1925) - Floris
 Reveille: The Great Awakening (1925)
 Hedda Gabler (1925) - Gerichtsrat Brack
 In the Valleys of the Southern Rhine (1925, part 1, 2) - Philipp Steinherr
 Goetz von Berlichingen of the Iron Hand (1925)
 The House of Lies (1926) - Jan Werle
 Three Cuckoo Clocks (1926) - Mason
 Sword and Shield (1926) - Friedrich Wilhelm I, König von Preußen
 The Eleven Schill Officers (1926) - French commander
 Superfluous People (1926) - Bronsa
 Aftermath (1927) - Der Gutsvogt
 The Sporck Battalion (1927) - Forstmeister von Rüdiger
 Lützow's Wild Hunt (1927) - Beethoven
 Love Affairs (1927)
 One Against All (1927)
 Children's Souls Accuse You (1927) - Kommerzienrat Enzenberg
 Venus im Frack (1927)
 Regine (1927) - Regines Vater
 The Convicted (1927)
 The Bordello in Rio (1927) - Paul Schröder (Plumowski)
 At the Edge of the World (1927) - Der Müller
 Light Cavalry (1927) - Rabbi Süß
 § 182 minderjährig (1927)
 Le roman d'un jeune homme pauvre (1927) - Le grand-père
 The Girl from Abroad (1927)
 The Prince of Rogues (1928) - Leyendecker
 Majestät schneidet Bubiköpfe (1928) - Handwerker
 Die Sandgräfin (1928)
 Autumn on the Rhine (1928) - Kallborn, Wirt
 The Tsarevich (1929) - The Czar
 Die von der Scholle sind (1928) - Moser
 The Last Fort (1929) - Lensky, Kommandant
 Fräulein Else (1929) - Von Dorsday
 Asphalt (1929) - Hauptwachtmeister Holk
 The Crimson Circle (1929) - Froyant

References

External links

1872 births
1929 deaths
People from Bad Arolsen
People from the Principality of Waldeck and Pyrmont
20th-century German male actors
German male stage actors
German male film actors
German male silent film actors